Build Bright University (BBU; ,) is a university in Cambodia with eight campuses, in Phnom Penh, and the provinces of Siem Reap, Battambang, Banteay Meanchey, Sihanoukville, Takéo, Ratanakiri and Stung Treng.

The university in Siem Reap is the largest university in Siem Reap with an enrollment of 5000 students.

See also
Build Bright United FC

References

External links
 

Universities in Cambodia
Siem Reap